Mark Kwok Yiu Ming (born 28 October 1964) is a former Hong Kong television actor. He made his debut in TVB’s long running series, A Kindred Spirit (1996). Prior to that, he acted in one drama in ATV before moving to TVB.

He left the acting industry in 2007, with his last work being The Ultimate Crime Fighter.

Kwok currently works as an insurance salesman.

Filmography

External links
Hong Kong Cinemagic: Mark Kwok Yiu Ming

1964 births
TVB actors
Hong Kong male actors
Living people